Sir William Stanley Goosman  (2 July 1890 – 10 June 1969) was a New Zealand politician of the National Party and a road-haulier and contractor.

Biography

Goosman was born in 1890 at Auckland. William Massey was his uncle. He received his education at Mangere and at the age of 13, he started work on a dairy farm. At age 17, he went to Gisborne and worked in the bush. During the Great Depression, he started a transport business at Waihou, near Te Aroha, which grew into a large company. He was also a roading contractor.

He was the Member of Parliament for Waikato –1946,  –1954,  –1957, then Piako again –1963, when he retired. When defending the government during the 1951 waterfront lockout, he said, "All I have to say is that if Hitler had to deal with the same thing Hitler talked right."

He was the Minister of Works, Minister of Transport, Minister of Marine, Minister of Housing and Minister of Railways in the First National Government from 1949 to 1954. In those roles, he decided to drop proposals to improve Auckland's rail network and instead focus on motorway building. When opening the first of Auckland's motorways in 1953, he is reported to have said, "My boy, the future of Auckland is with the motor car". One of his first actions as Railway Minister was to raise charges and fares.

Despite carrying six ministerial portfolios in the First National Government, when the Second National Government was formed in 1960 he was offered only the Works portfolio causing him to protest to Keith Holyoake and Jack Marshall (who had concerns about his age at 70) and offered to retire which they dissuaded him from doing. He interpreted it as a vote of no confidence in his abilities and claimed he still had the energy of a much younger man, to settle the issue he was additionally appointed as Minister of Electricity to his satisfaction.

In the 1965 Queen's Birthday Honours, Goosman was appointed a Knight Commander of the Order of St Michael and St George, for political and public services. The Stanley Goosman Bridge over the Taramakau River near Jacksons carries his name.

Notes

References

|-

|-

|-

|-

|-

1890 births
1969 deaths
New Zealand Knights Commander of the Order of St Michael and St George
New Zealand National Party MPs
Members of the Cabinet of New Zealand
Ministers of Housing (New Zealand)
New Zealand MPs for North Island electorates
Members of the New Zealand House of Representatives
20th-century New Zealand politicians
People from Auckland
New Zealand politicians awarded knighthoods